Regidor is a town and municipality located in the Bolívar Department, northern Colombia in a lowland area along the banks of the Magdalena River.  The principal industry of Regidor is cultivation of Oil Palm.  Many subsistence farmers have been pressured to sell their land to oil palm companies and to displace.

References
Regidor official website

Municipalities of Bolívar Department